Royal Marines recruit training is the longest basic modern infantry training programme of any Commonwealth, or North Atlantic Treaty Organization (NATO) combat troops. The Royal Marines are the only part of the British Armed Forces where officers and other ranks are trained at the same location, the Commando Training Centre Royal Marines (CTCRM) at Lympstone, Devon.  Much of the basic training is carried out on the rugged terrain of Dartmoor and Woodbury Common with a significant proportion taking place at night.

Selection

All potential recruits take a psychometric test and are interviewed at the Armed Forces Careers Office (AFCO) to assess their suitability. A series of physical assessments are conducted including a sight test and medical examination. Then the Pre Joining Fitness Test: two 1.5-mile runs (2.4 km) on a treadmill, the first to be completed within 12 minutes 30 seconds, the second within 10 minutes and 30 seconds, with 1 minute of rest in between.

Royal Marines recruits must be aged 16 to 32 (they must be in Recruit Training before their 33rd birthday). Due to the July 2016 lifting on the ban on women in Ground Close Combat roles, females are now permitted to join all British military infantry units, including the Royal Marines Commandos.

The final selection assessment for potential recruits is either the Potential Royal Marine Course (PRMC) for ratings candidates, or the Potential Officer Course (POC) and Admiralty Interview Board for officer candidates. PRMC and POC last three days and assess physical ability and intellectual capacity to undertake the recruit training. Potential Officers must be aged 18 to 25.

Training

Basic training
The first weeks of training are spent learning basic skills that will be used later. This includes much time spent on the parade ground and on the rifle ranges. The long history of the Royal Marines is also highlighted through a visit to the Royal Marines Museum in Southsea, Hampshire.

Physical training at this stage emphasizes all-round physical strength, endurance and flexibility in order to develop the muscles necessary to carry the heavy equipment a marine will use in an operational unit.  Key milestones include a gym passout at week 9 (not carried out with fighting order), a battle swimming test, and learning to do a "regain" (i.e. climb back onto a rope suspended over a water tank). Most of these tests are completed wearing fighting order of 31 lb (14 kg) of Personal Load Carrying Equipment. Individual fieldcraft skills are also taught at this basic stage.

Young officer (YO) training begins with Phase 1 which teaches the officers how to be Royal Marines.

Training modules

Foundation – 3 weeks

Individual Skills – 7 weeks

Advanced Skills – 5 weeks

Operations Of War – 10 weeks

Commando Phase – 6 weeks

Kings Squad – 1 week

YO Training Modules

Phase 1: Initial Training

This 16-week training course will introduce the YO's to the core skills they need to be a Royal Marine, and assess their abilities in an intensive and progressive environment.

Phase 2: Tactics and Doctrine Training

For the next 12 weeks the training will switch focus to Section and Troop level tactical development. Using what the YO's have already learnt, they will spend time preparing, delivering and receiving orders. This phase will incorporate a mixture of academic study and advanced physical training.

Phase 3 – Defensive, Fibua, Special to Arms, and Commando Course Phase

This six-week phase will hone the YO's defensive skills, teaching  the principles of transitional operations, and introduce the YO's to the tactics of Fighting In Built Up Areas (FIBUA).

Phase 4 – Advanced Military Management Training

This phase is designed to broaden the YO's experience and military knowledge. They will complete a two-week range qualification course, before further academic study at BRNC Dartmouth. Additional exercises will take place during a deployment to the United States.

Phase 5 – Unit Management, Exercise Planning and Final Exercise.

This phase will provide the YO's with the essential ability to administrate and manage their men. Topics that they will cover, include:

Military law

Report writing

Unit documentation

Strategic studies

A planning exercise in Normandy

Training exercises

Throughout basic training, recruits must undergo many exercises testing what they have learnt up to that point.

 Early Knight – week 2
 First Step – week 4
 Quick Cover – week 5
 Marshal Star – week 7
 Hunters Moon – week 10
 Baptist Walk – week 13
 Baptist Run – week 14
 First Base – week 16
 Second Empire – week 18
 Holdfast – week 20
 Urban Warrior – week 21
 Violent Entry – week 22
 Field Firing exercise – weeks 26 & 27
 Final exercise – weeks 29 & 30
 Commando tests – week 31

YO Training exercises

Throughout YO training, Young Officers must undergo many exercises testing what they have learnt up to that point.

Phase 1
 First Stop – This is designed to introduce them to life in the field, teaching them how to look after themselves and navigate by day and night
 Tenderfoot – Here they will put the skills they have developed into practice, progressing to basic fieldcraft
 Lost Tribe – This is a day and night navigation exercise on Dartmoor. They'll need to be able to cope with unfamiliar terrain and remain calm under pressure
 Eye Opener – Another navigation exercise, this will also test their day and night navigation skills. It takes place over a longer period of time, so they will need stamina to be successful
 Quickdraw I – This is a firing range exercise, which is designed to bring their marksmanship skills up to standard. At the end of the exercise, they will take the Annual Combat Marksmanship Test (ACMT)
 Softly Softly – Here they will be introduced to low-level soldiering skills and basic operating procedures, at the same time as developing an understanding of the Estimate and Orders process

Phase 2
 Quickdraw II – They will make the transition from the firing range to live field firing, starting with Close Quarter Battle (CQB), before progressing to team firing and manoeuvres
 Long Night – Over the course of a week they will develop your tactical knowledge, and the ability to take the lead in different scenarios
 Eagle Eye – they will be taught to establish and run surface and sub-surface observation points
 Jagged Edge – This will teach them all about Troop level battle procedures and offensive operations
 Dragon Storm – Drawing on everything they've learned about offensive operations, they will complete a test exercise
 Quickdraw III – Tactical live firing training

Phase 3
 Open Door – This exercise will focus on conducting FIBUA operations up to Troop level
 Special To Arms Week – Here they will have an introduction to the specialist weapons and equipment that they'll use throughout their career
 Endurance Course – they will need to complete this in less than 71 minutes
 A 9-mile Speed March – they will need to complete this uphill route in less than 90 minutes
 Tarzan Assault Course – This ropes and ladders course will need to be completed in less than 12 minutes
 The 30 Miler – they will have 7 hours to complete this cross-terrain challenge, unlike recruits they must navigate it themselves

Phase 4
 Stone Post – they will conduct a number of visits that focus on the Army's land capabilities. This will broaden their Service knowledge
 Special To Arms Week – Here they will have an introduction to the specialist weapons and equipment that they'll use throughout their career
 Deep Blue – Similar to Stone Post, this exercise will provide them with an insight into the capabilities of the Royal Navy
 Virginia Tempest – This is a three-week deployment to the US, where they will forge closer links with the United States Marine Corps, and complete a number field exercises

Phase 5
Final Exercise consists of:
 Wet Raider – Taking place on the West Coast of Scotland, this is where their amphibious training will conclude
 Counter Insurgency – This is one of the most realistic experiences in training, replicating a full-scale riot
 Final Nail – they will be integrated with trained marines and use VIKING vehicles
 Otter's Run – Use of a series of hypothetical scenarios to hone their decision-making skills

The Commando course
The culmination of training is the Commando course. Following the Royal Marines taking on responsibility for the Commando role with the disbandment of the Army Commandos at the end of World War II, all Royal Marines, except those in the Royal Marines Band Service, complete the Commando course as part of their training (see below). Key aspects of the course include climbing and ropework techniques, patrolling and amphibious warfare operations.

This intense phase ends with a series of tests which have remained virtually unchanged since World War II. Again, these tests are done in full fighting order of 32 lb (14.5 kg) of equipment.

The Commando tests are taken on consecutive days and all four tests must be successfully completed within a seven-day period; they include;

A nine mile (14.5 km) speed march, carrying full fighting order, to be completed in 90 minutes; the pace is thus 10 minutes per mile (9.6 km/h or 6 mph).
The Endurance course is a six-mile (9.65 km) course which begins with a two-mile (3.22 km) run across rough moorland and woodland terrain at Woodbury Common near Lympstone, which includes tunnels, pipes, wading pools, and an underwater culvert. The course ends with a four-mile (6 km) run back to CTCRM. Followed by a marksmanship test, where the recruit must hit 6 out of 10 shots at a 25m target simulating 200 m. To be completed in 73 minutes (71 minutes for Royal Marine officers). Originally 72 minutes, these times were recently increased by one minute as the route of the course was altered.
The Tarzan Assault Course. This is an assault course combined with an aerial confidence test. It starts with a death slide (now known as the Commando Slide) and ends with a rope climb up a thirty-foot near-vertical wall. It must be completed with full fighting order in 13 minutes, 12 minutes for officers. The Potential Officers Course also includes confidence tests from the Tarzan Assault Course, although not with equipment.
The 30 miler. This is a 30-mile (48-km) march across upland Dartmoor, wearing full fighting order, and additional safety equipment carried by the recruit in a daysack. It must be completed in eight hours for recruits and seven hours for Royal Marine officers, who must also navigate the route themselves, rather than following a DS (a trained Royal Marine) with the rest of a syndicate and carry their own equipment.

After the  march, any who failed any of the tests may attempt to retake them up until the seven-day window expires. If a recruit fails two or more of the tests, however, it is unlikely that a chance to re-attempt them will be offered.

Normally the seven- to eight-day schedule for the Commando Tests is as follows:
Saturday – Endurance Course
Sunday – Rest
Monday – Nine Mile Speed March
Tuesday – Tarzan Assault Course
Wednesday – 30 Miler
Thursday – Failed test re-runs
Friday – Failed test re-runs
Saturday – 30 Miler re-run if required

Completing the Commando course successfully entitles the recruit or officer to wear the green beret but does not mean that the Royal Marine has finished his training. That decision will be made by the troop or batch training team and will depend on the recruit's or young officer's overall performance. Furthermore, officer training consists of many more months.  Training to be a Royal Marine takes 32 weeks. The last week is spent mainly on administration and preparing for the pass out parade. Recruits in their final week of training are known as the King's Squad and have their own section of the recruits' galley at Lympstone.  After basic and commando training, a Royal Marine Commando will normally join a unit of 3 Commando Brigade. There are four Royal Marines Commando infantry units in the Brigade: 40 Commando located at Norton Manor Camp near Taunton in Somerset; 42 Commando at Bickleigh Barracks, near Plymouth, Devon; 43 Commando FPGRM at HMNB Clyde near Glasgow; and 45 Commando at RM Condor, Arbroath on the coast of Angus.

Non-Royal Marine volunteers for Commando training undertake the All Arms Commando Course.  There is also a Reserve Commando Course run for members of the Royal Marines Reserve and Commando units of the Army Reserve.

YO Exams/Qualifications
 Map reading exam
 Signals exam
 Military Law exam
 Operations other than war exam
 Nuclear, Biological and Chemical Defence exam
 Strategic studies exam
 Part 1, Part 2 and end of course final exams
 The Commando tests
 Infantry range supervisor's qualification
 Helicopter Underwater Escape Training
 One-day Sea Survival Course
 Information Technology Level 2
 Defence Instructional Technique

Specialist training

Upon completion of training, Royal Marine recruits spend a period of time as a General Duties Rifleman. They are assigned to one of the three Commando battalions or a Fleet Standby Rifle Troop on board a Royal Navy ship for up to two years before being sent for specialist training.

Commandos may then go on to undertake specialist training in a variety of skills:

Recruit Specialisations
Aircrewman
Assault Engineer
Armoured Support Group (Viking)
Armourer
Clerk
Combat Intelligence
Communications Technician
Drill Instructor
Driver
Heavy Weapons – Air Defence
Heavy Weapons – Anti-Tank
Heavy Weapons – Mortars
Information Systems
Landing Craft Coxswain
Medical Assistant
Metalsmith
Military Police
Mountain Leader
Platoon Weapons Instructor
Physical Training Instructor (PTI)
Reconnaissance Operator
Signaller
Special Forces Communicator
Swimmer Canoeist
Stores Accountant
Telecommunications Technician (Tels Tech)
Vehicle Mechanic (VM)
Yeoman of Signals

Officer specialisations (recently decreased from 7 to 3)
Landing Craft Officer
Mountain Leader
Signals Officer

Training for these specialisations may be undertaken at CTCRM or in a tri-service training centre such as the Defence School of Transport at Leconfield, the Defence School of Electronic and Mechanical Engineering (DSEME) at MOD Lyneham, Wiltshire, Defence Helicopter Flying School (pilots/aircrew) or the Defence School of Policing and Guarding.

Some marines are trained in military parachuting to allow flexibility of insertion methods for all force elements. Marines complete this training at RAF Brize Norton but are not required to undergo Pre-Parachute Selection Course (P-Company) training due to the arduous nature of the commando course they have already completed.

See also
 Royal Marines
 P company
 Special Boat Service#Recruitment, selection and training

References

Selection
Royal Marines training
Military selection in the United Kingdom